, also known as riichi mahjong, is a variation of mahjong. While the basic rules to the game are retained, the variation features a unique set of rules such as riichi and the use of dora. The variant is one of a few styles where discarded tiles are ordered rather than placed in a disorganized pile.  This is primarily due to the furiten rule, which takes player discards into account.  The variant has grown popularity due to anime, manga, and online platforms.

History
In 1924, a soldier named Saburo Hirayama brought the game to Japan.  In Tokyo, he started a mahjong club, parlor, and school.  In the years after, the game dramatically increased in popularity.  In this process, the game itself was simplified from the Chinese version. Then later, additional rules were adopted to increase the complexity.
Mahjong, as of 2010, is the most popular table game in Japan. As of 2008, there were approximately 7.6 million mahjong players and about 8,900 mahjong parlors in the country. The parlors did 300 billion yen in sales in 2008. There are several manga and anime devoted to dramatic and comic situations involving mahjong (see Media). Japanese video arcades have introduced mahjong arcade machines that can be connected to others over the Internet. There are also video game versions of strip mahjong.

In Japan, there are what are known as professional players, usually members of organizations that compete in internal leagues and external events with other professionals and the general public. There are over 1,700 professionals spread across a half-dozen organizations. There is no universal authority for riichi mahjong in Japan: professionals cannot dictate how mahjong parlors or amateur organizations and players operate, nor can they regulate each other since everything is left to the free market. Likewise, there is no global authority regulating riichi mahjong.  Since 2018, there exists a league of select professionals (coming from the other professional mahjong organizations) named M.League, sponsored by Daiwa Securities, which takes the game and presents it as a professional sport. Teams of professionals receive salary as players, compete in ranking and playoffs as teams, and wear team jerseys to enhance the image of mahjong as a sport.

Setup

Japanese mahjong is usually played with 136 tiles. The tiles are mixed and then arranged into four walls that are each two stacked tiles high and 17 tiles wide. 26 of the stacks are used to build the players' starting hands, 7 stacks are used to form a dead wall, and the remaining 35 stacks form the playing wall.

There are 34 different kinds of tiles, with four of each kind. Just like standard mahjong, there are three suits of tiles, pin (circles), sō (bamboo) and wan (characters), and unranked honor tiles (字牌 jihai). Honor tiles are further divided between wind tiles and dragon tiles. Some rules may have red number five tiles which work as dora that earn more han value.  The flower and season tiles are omitted. Names for suit tiles follow the pattern of [number] + [suit], the numbers being Japanese pronunciations of the corresponding Chinese words.

Pin (筒子, pinzu): Named as each tile consists of a number of circles.

Sō (索子, sōzu): Named as each tile consists of a number of bamboo sticks that hold a hundred coins each. The face of the number one tiles is a peafowl.

Man (萬子, wanzu, or manzu): Named as each tile consists of a number of ten thousands (萬, wan, or man; see the lower character on the tile). Originally, this was 10,000 coins made up of 100 strings of 100 coins each (see mahjong tiles). The kanji of number five usually becomes "伍" instead of "五". The modern Japanese standard uses wan as the suit's suffix, most western languages including English will use man instead. The seven in this suit would thus be called chiiwan in Japanese, but seven-man (or 7-man) in English.

Wind tiles (風牌, kazehai): Named after the four cardinal directions.

Dragon tiles (三元牌, sangenpai): White (白, haku), Green (發, hatsu), and Red (中, chun).  Often, the face of the White dragon tiles is blank white. The kanji of the Green dragon tiles in Japan is usually 𤼵 which is slightly different from 發 since it includes the kanji 矢 instead of 殳.

General mahjong rules
Many basic rules of mahjong apply to the Japanese variation. Valid collections of three tiles are called groups (mentsu), divided into triplets (kōtsu) and sequences (shuntsu). Players can also form a quad using four of the same tile.

Making groups by calling (melding)
Players can make a meld (open group) by calling for another player's discard. They reveal the meld on the table and then make their own discard. Calling for another player's discard makes the group and the hand open. When a winning tile of a closed hand is a discard, the group including that discard is also considered open, while the hand is still regarded as closed.  The calls operate exactly the same as any variation of mahjong, except Japanese terminology is used.

Chii
Players can make an open sequential group, a sequence (3 consecutive tiles in the same suit), by calling out "chii" (吃 or チー) using a tile discarded by the left player, who is prior in order. Players place the meld face up on the table, usually on the right side of their hands, with the discard placed sideways at the leftmost position of the meld to indicate which tile was taken from the left's discard pile.

Pon
Players can make an open identical group, a triplet (3 identical tiles in the same suit, or 3 identical honor tiles) by calling out "pon" (碰 or ポン) using a tile discarded by any other player. Players place the meld face up on the table with one of those tiles placed sideways to indicate from whom the discard was taken.

Kan
Players can make a meld from 4 identical tiles in the same suit or 4 identical honor tiles. After calling a quad, the next adjacent dora indicator tile is flipped, and players need to draw a supplemental tile from the end of the dead wall. Depending on the rules, the number of tiles in the dead wall is kept at 14 by reserving the last available tile from the wall, or the number decreases at that time. There are three types of quads. Players call out "kan" (槓 or カン) for all of them.

 Closed quad: Players can make a closed quad if they have four of the same tile in their hand. They reveal those tiles, then place them to the right side of their hand with two tiles face up and two face down. They then draw another tile from the dead wall. A closed quad does not use another player's discard and does not open their hand.
 Open quad: Players can make an open quad using another player's discarded tile if they have three of that same tile in their hand. They reveal the meld on the table with all four tiles face up, with one placed sideways to indicate from whom the discard was taken. Players cannot make this type of quad using an open meld of three tiles.
 Added open quad: Players can make an added open quad (kakan; 加槓) by adding a self-drawn tile or a tile already in their hand to an open meld of the same three tiles. The tile is usually added sideways on top of the sideways tile in the open meld.

Precedence order
The order of precedence to pick up a discard when two or more players want it is ron (winning) first, kan or pon second, and chii third. Kan and pon cannot happen at the same time since there are only four of each tile. Depending on the ruleset being used, these calls may be allowed when the next player has already drawn and seen their next tile. In such cases, that player takes first precedence if they call tsumo.

Japanese rules overview
While the basic rules to mahjong apply with the Japanese variation, an additional, distinct set of rules are applied. (See the rules for Old Hong Kong Mahjong.)

Yaku and yakuman

Yaku are specific combinations of tiles or conditions that yield the value of hands.  Unlike many variants, a winning hand consists of four melds and requires at least one yaku.  When scoring, each yaku has its own han value, and the han works as a doubler. A winning hand needs at least one yaku. Yakuman is a value for limit hands which are hard to get, and in some variations cumulative and/or multiple yakuman can be counted. Yakuman-class hands ignore all other scoring patterns and points.

Riichi
Declaring riichi means declaring a ready hand, and is a kind of yaku. A player may declare ready if a player's hand needs only one tile to complete a legal hand (tenpai), and the player has not claimed another players' discards to make open melds. When declaring ready, a player can win on a discard even when the hand didn't have a yaku because ready itself is a yaku.  Upon declaring ready, the player must pay a deposit and may no longer change their hand except when forming certain closed quads.

As a possible house rule, a player can choose to reveal their hand to win more points if successful, which is called ōpun riichi (open riichi). In that case, the player shows only the tiles that are related to waits, or reveals all the tiles in the hand depending on the rules. The declaration increases the yaku count allowing the player to score extra points.

Dora
Dora (ドラ) are bonus tiles that add han value to a winning hand. Every kind of tile can become a dora tile. A dora tile adds the same number of han value as the amount of its corresponding "dora indicator" tiles.  Dora is not counted as yaku, and having it without yaku does not meet the one yaku requirement for a winning hand.

At the start of a hand, the upper tile from the third stack of back end of the dead wall is flipped and becomes a dora indicator. Then, its succeeding tile is recognized as dora. For example, if an indicator is a Green dragon, Red dragons are counted as dora by the sequence shown below, in which the Red dragon wraps around to the White dragon.

The succeeding order of dora is as follows:

---------

---------

---------

----

---

The number of dora indicators increases in the following manner: Each time a player calls a quad, the next adjacent dora indicator tile is flipped, starting with the upper tile from the fourth stack from the back end. The indicator is flipped immediately after the quad is called, and after that the player draws a supplemental tile for their hand from the back end of the dead wall. The number of indicators increases in that direction, which becomes five if a single player calls four quads, and that is the largest possible number from the upper tiles in the third to seventh stacks of the dead wall (see four quads).

In addition, when a player goes out with a declaration of riichi (ready hand), the tiles underneath the dora indicators are flipped after the win and become additional dora indicators, making their succeeding tiles also counted as dora which are called ura-dora (裏ドラ, hidden dora).

It is said that the name dora stands for "dragon," although it has nothing to do with dragon tiles in contemporary Japanese mahjong.

 Red 5 tiles: A variation uses specially marked red number 5 tiles that also count as dora themselves, regardless of dora indicators. In addition, if a dora indicator is number 4 of the same suit as red 5 tiles, players acquire further han value. One red 5 tile for each suit is usually used in place of regular five tiles, with some local variants using various amounts (two 5-pin only, two 5-pin and one 5-sō and 5-wan, two of each 5 in all three suits, et cetera). In some variations, tiles of other numbers such as 3 or 7 can be marked red.

Scoring system

Among the mahjong variants, the Japanese scoring system is unique.  Two variables are considered: the han value and fu value.  A hand winner acquires points based on these values, which correspond to a points-value table.  If the han value is five or more, then the fu value is still counted but no longer necessary.

Winning
There is a distinction between winning from the wall and winning from a discard. When going out, players call out "tsumo" (自摸 or ツモ, self-drawn) or "ron" (栄 or ロン, picking up a discard).  In the case of tsumo, the other three players share the responsibility of paying out points, according to the scoring table.  For ron, the player who discarded the tile pays all of the points.

Arranged discards
In many mahjong variants, discards are simply placed in the middle of the table in a disorganized fashion.  However, with the Japanese variant, tiles are neatly placed in order of discard in front of each player.  In turn, each player accumulates a discard pile, with each hand.  Typically, discards are placed in rows of 6 tiles as per customary rule.  In addition, open calls for chii, pon, and kan have discard specific rules, by which they must indicate the source and type of discarded tile.  This way, a record is maintained for all discarded tiles corresponding to each player.  Likewise, game strategy depends on the state of the discards and the players' hands.

Sacred discard
In the sacred discard rules, which are also called furiten (振聴 or フリテン), there are three situations in which a win using another player's discard is forbidden:
 A player cannot win on any discard if any of their potential winning tiles are present in their discard pile. This includes tiles that have been called by other players for open melds.
 If a winning tile is discarded and the player does not call it to win, that player cannot win on any discard after it until their next turn.  This is known as "temporary furiten". This applies even if that winning tile could not have been called for the win due to the resulting hand having no yaku. Generally, other players making open melds does not end temporary furiten.
 Temporary furiten is permanent after riichi - If a player passes on a winning discard after declaring riichi, that player can no longer win on any discard.

Abortive draws
In Japanese mahjong, many rules allow abortive draws to be declared while tiles are still available. They can be declared under the following conditions:

 , shortened from : On a player's first turn when no meld has been called, if a player has nine different terminal (also known as major) or honor tiles, the player may declare the hand to be drawn. For example, the hand may be . They could instead go for the thirteen orphans (kokushi musō) hand.
 : On the first turn without any meld calls, if all four players discard the same Wind tile, the hand is drawn.
 , or : If all four players declare riichi, the hand is drawn after the last player discards without dealing in. 
 : The hand is drawn when a winning hand cannot be made from the discard after the fourth quad is called, unless all the four quads were called by a single player. If the four quads were collectively called by two or more players, the game may end upon the last player to make a quad discarding (either safely or dealing in), or it may end immediately. If all four quads were called by a single player, the hand continues. Once four quads have been made and the game is allowed to continue, generally, a fifth quad is unable to be formed. Like most optional settings, it is possible that a local mechanism is in place to allow for further quads, but is very rare.

Chombo
Players may be penalized under the following circumstances:
 Gotsumo. Calling tsumo with an invalid hand
 Furiten ron. Calling ron while furiten
 Noten riichi.  Calling riichi while not in tenpai
 Machi ga kawaru riichi-go no kan  (待ちが変わるリーチ後のカン) Closed kan after riichi if the kan changes the player's waits
 Tāhai (多牌). Having more tiles than allowed (depending on the rules)
 Yamakuzure (山崩れ).  Literally 'landslide'.  Damaging the wall to the point that it cannot be recovered

Game ending conditions
A game ends after the last hand of the last round, which is usually the South (prevailing wind) round.

Bankruptcy
A game ends when a player's score becomes negative (below zero), or in some rare local rules, at zero points or less. Some rules may allow continued gameplay with a player having a negative point value.

Runaway victory
Some rule sets allow for the last dealer to decide whether to continue playing extra hands in the final round or stop. A runaway victory (agari-yame, あがりやめ, "win and stop") is when the last dealer decides to exercise this option after winning a hand, for instance when they are the top player at the time. In some cases, a stop may be allowed simply for playing a hand and ending with a ready hand (tenpai-yame, 聴牌やめ), or in very rare cases, allow the last dealer to end the game regardless of position.

Continuing into West
If the score of the top player is less than 30,000 points after the last hand of the last round, the game continues into the West round (西場) in some rules. This situation is called shānyū (西入; entering West). The prevailing wind becomes West. A North round (北場) may come next in the same way. Depending on the rules, it can be followed by an East round again or instead White dragon, Green dragon, Red dragon and East rounds. Any extra round ends as soon as one player has 30,000 points or more.

Settling the score
At the end of a match, players are often given bonus points or penalties depending on their placement (see final points and place).

Yakitori

In an optional rule called yakitori (焼き鳥), if one did not win a hand in a match, that player pays a penalty. At the start of a match, each player has a marker called yakitori māku (mark) (焼き鳥マーク) on the table, and a player flips their own after winning a hand. Chips or coins are also used as substitutes, and they are often removed instead of being flipped.

Shūgi
Often in mahjong parlors across Japan, an additional bonus payment called shūgi (祝儀) is given to players who won their hand. For each shūgi the winning hand has, additional payments are made by either the player who threw the winning tile, or by each player in the case of a self-draw.
Common shūgi are:
 Limit value hands (yakuman 役満)
 One-shot (ippatsu 一発)
 Red fives (or other extra red tiles) dora (aka-dora 赤ドラ)
 Ura-dora (裏ドラ)

Theory 

Japanese Mahjong has an extensively developed theory. Japanese Mahjong is reliant on both skill and luck, so strategy focuses on gaining probabilistic and strategical advantages.

Japanese Mahjong is a comparative point game. Unlike betting variations of Mahjong, decisions are made compared to other players instead of a strict expected value basis.

Tile Acceptance 
In Japanese Mahjong the first player to complete their hand wins the round. As a result, it is typically advantageous for players to reach a complete hand as fast as possible.

Tile efficiency, also known as tile acceptance theory, is a concept to estimate which tile is best to discard. The goal is to move to a completed hand as fast as possible, aided by maximizing the number of available tiles that improve the hand

Discards should aim to reduce the shanten (向聴) of the hand, the number of tiles required to reach a ready hand (tenpai). As a consequence, discards should also aim to increase the ukeire (受け入れ) of the hand, the number of tiles that can be drawn to reduce shanten.

As Mahjong is a game dependent on psychology and game theory, experienced players often deviate from strict tile acceptance theory, aiming to bluff or mislead opponents.

Folding 
Similar to other betting games such as Poker, players may choose to abandon completing their hand. Folding aims to avoid paying the penalty of dealing into a victory (ron). Although there is no way to withdraw from the round and stop discarding, players can focus on discarding "safe tiles" under the general strategy betaori (ベタ降り).

The ability to fold in Japanese Mahjong is aided by the sacred discard rules (furiten) which create guaranteed safe tiles Genbutsu (現物).

Related versions
There is a three player version called sanma (三麻), which eliminates 28 tiles from the number suit's 2-man through 8-man tiles and removes the ability to call "chii". 
There is a four player version called "Clear Mahjong" that was created by Noboyuki Fukomoto for the manga "Ten: Tenhōdōri No Kaidanji".
There is a version for two players called "San Hako Mahjong" that keeps all tiles, permits calling "chii", and utilizes a dummy player.

Media
This variant is featured in anime and manga series such as Akagi, The Legend of the Gambler: Tetsuya,Saki and Mudazumo Naki Kaikaku.  A live action series named  features the game involving yakuza and gambling, while employing various cheating tactics and techniques.

Mahjong Soul is based on this type of mahjong.

Gaming platforms
The variant is available via online play.  In addition, many game consoles port mahjong games, as well as various PC and mobile phone software.

Global community
Outside Japan, there are clubs sporadically located across Europe, North America, Asia and South America. There are also tournaments of various sizes, the largest outside of Japan being the World Riichi Championship. Smaller events, such as the European Riichi Championship, as well as a few other tournaments can have attendance numbers of tens of people, sometimes even over 100 at events like the European Riichi Championship, and as high as 224 at the World Riichi Championship (2017 Las Vegas edition). The total reach extends to almost 50 countries, but some countries may have few players, others may have hundreds or thousands.

See also
 World Riichi Championship
 European Mahjong Association

References

External links
 World Riichi Championship Rules and Clarifications page
 European Mahjong Association's Riichi Ruleset

Mahjong
 Japanese